Rhinoptilus  is a genus of coursers, a group of wading birds. There are three species, which breed in Africa and South Asia. They have long legs, short wings and long pointed bills which curve downwards. Although classed as waders, they inhabit deserts and similar arid regions. Like the pratincoles, the coursers are found in warmer parts of the Old World. They hunt insects by sight, pursuing them on foot.

Species in the genus have earlier been placed under other genus names including Macrotarsius (Blyth), Chalcopterus (Reich.) and Hemerodromus (Heuglin). Some characteristics of this largely African genus include a bill that is shorter and stouter than in Cursorius, the orbits are feathered and the 2nd and 3rd primaries nearly equal and the longest. The tarsus is long and scutellate, the feet are short and the outer toe is joined by partial webbing.

Their 2–3 eggs are laid on the ground.

Species in taxonomic order
Three-banded courser  Rhinoptilus cinctus
Bronze-winged courser or Violet-tipped courser, Rhinoptilus chalcopterus
Jerdon's courser  Rhinoptilus bitorquatus
Double-banded courser, Rhinoptilus africanus

References

 
Bird genera